In mathematics, a weighing matrix of order  and weight  is a matrix  with entries from the set  such that:

The weight  is also called the degree of the matrix.

Weighing matrices are so called because of their use in optimally measuring the individual weights of multiple objects. When the weighing device is a balance scale, the statistical variance of the measurement can be minimized by weighing multiple objects at once, including some objects in the opposite pan of the scale where they subtract from the measurement.

Properties

Some properties are immediate from the definition.
Similarly, the columns are pairwise orthogonal.
 Each row and each column of  has exactly  non-zero elements.
 , since the definition means that  where  is the inverse of 
  where  is the determinant of 

A weighing matrix is a generalization of Hadamard matrix, which does not allow zero entries.

Applications

Experiment design

Weighing matrices take their name from the problem of measuring the weight of multiple objects. It is possible to increase the accuracy of the estimated weights by measuring different subsets of the objects, especially when using a balance scale where objects can be put on the opposite measuring pan where they subtract their weight from the measurement.

An order  matrix  can be used to represent the placement of  objects—including the tare weight—in  trials. Suppose the left pan of the balance scale adds to the measurement and the right pan subtracts from the measurement. Each element of this matrix  will have:

Let  be a column vector of the measurements of each of the  trials, let  be the errors to these measurements each independent and identically distributed with variance , and let  be a column vector of the true weights of each of the  objects. Then we have:

Assuming that  is non-singular, we can use the method of least-squares to calculate an estimate of the true weights:

Optical measurement

Weighing matrices appear in the engineering of spectrometers, image scanners, and optical multiplexing systems. The design of these instruments involve an optical mask and two detectors that measure the intensity of light. The mask can either transmit light to the first detector, absorb it, or reflect it toward the second detector. The measurement of the second detector is subtracted from the first, and so these three cases correspond to weighing matrix elements of 1, 0, and -1 respectively. As this is essentially the same measurement problem as in the previous section, the usefulness of weighing matrices also applies.

Examples

Note that when weighing matrices are displayed, the symbol  is used to represent −1. Here are some examples:

This is a :

This is a :

This is a :

Another :

Which is cyclic, namely, each row is a cyclic shift of the previous row.
Circulant weighing matrices are of special interest since their algebraic structure makes them easier for classification. Indeed, we know that a circulant weighing matrix of order  and weight  must be of square weight. So, weights  are permissible and weights  have been completely classified.
Two special (and actually, extreme) cases of circulant weighing matrices are (A) circulant Hadamard matrices which are conjectured not to exist unless their order is less than 5. This conjecture, circulant Hadamard conjecture first raised by Ryser is known to be true for many orders but is still open. (B)  of weight  and minimal order  exist if  is a power of a prime and such a circulant weighing matrix can be obtained by signing the complement of a finite projective plane.

Equivalence

Two weighing matrices are considered to be equivalent if one can be obtained from the other by a series of permutations and negations of the rows and columns of the matrix. The classification of weighing matrices is complete for cases where  ≤ 5 as well as all cases where  ≤ 15 are also completed. However, very little has been done beyond this with exception to classifying circulant weighing matrices.

Open Questions

There are many open questions about weighing matrices. A great deal about this is unknown.

This question has two different meanings. Enumerating up to equivalence and enumerating different matrices with same n,k parameters. Some papers were published on the first question but none were published on the second important question.

References

Matrix theory
Combinatorics
Design of experiments
Combinatorial design